Dracula ripleyana is a species of orchid. It can be found in Costa Rica.

References

ripleyana